The following lists events that happened during 1939 in Australia.

Incumbents

Monarch – George VI
Governor-General – Alexander Hore-Ruvthen, 1st Baron Gowrie
Prime Minister – Joseph Lyons (until 7 April), then Sir Earle Page (until 26 April), then Robert Menzies
Chief Justice – Sir John Latham

State Premiers
Premier of New South Wales – Bertram Stevens (until 5 August) then Alexander Mair
Premier of Queensland – William Forgan Smith
Premier of South Australia – Thomas Playford IV
Premier of Tasmania – Albert Ogilvie (until 10 June), then Edmund Dwyer-Gray (until 18 December), then Robert Cosgrove
Premier of Victoria – Albert Dunstan
Premier of Western Australia – John Willcock

State Governors
Governor of New South Wales – John Loder, 2nd Baron Wakehurst
Governor of Queensland – Sir Leslie Orme Wilson
Governor of South Australia – Sir Winston Dugan (until 23 February), then Sir Malcolm Barclay-Harvey (from 12 August)
Governor of Tasmania – Sir Ernest Clark
Governor of Victoria – William Vanneck, 5th Baron Huntingfield (until 4 April), then Sir Winston Dugan (from 17 July)
Governor of Western Australia – none appointed

Events
13 January – The bushfires of Black Friday kill 70 people in Victoria.
27 March – The first CAC Wirraway training aircraft, A20-3, takes to the air at Fishermans Bend, Victoria.
7 April – Prime Minister Joseph Lyons dies of a sudden heart attack, the first Prime Minister to die in office. Sir Earle Page, the leader of the Country Party is appointed caretaker Prime Minister until the United Australia Party can elect a new leader.
26 April – Robert Menzies is elected leader of the United Australia Party, and is sworn in as Prime Minister.
10 June – Premier of Tasmania Albert Ogilvie dies in office. Edmund Dwyer-Gray acts as Premier until he is officially elected as leader of the Labor Party in Tasmania on 6 July.
3 September – World War II begins. Australia declares war on Germany, following the United Kingdom and British Dominions' declaration of same, after the German invasion of Poland.
15 September – Robert Menzies announces a new War Cabinet.
1 December – Australia agrees to take 15,000 Jewish refugees fleeing Europe, following the German occupation of Austria and Czechoslovakia.
18 December – Edmund Dwyer-Gray steps aside as Premier of Tasmania, by prior arrangement with Robert Cosgrove to assume the premiership.

Arts and literature

 Max Meldrum wins the Archibald Prize with his portrait of The Hon G J Bell, Speaker of the House of Representatives

Sport
 Rivette wins the Melbourne Cup and Caulfield Cup
 Mosaic wins the Cox Plate
 South Australia wins the Sheffield Shield
 Balmain win the 1939 NSWRFL premiership, defeating South Sydney 33–4. Newtown finish in last place, claiming the wooden spoon.

Births

January 

 3 January – Janice Crosio, New South Wales politician
 4 January – J. S. Harry, poet (d. 2015)
 6 January
 Roderick Weir Home, academic and historian
 Murray Rose, Olympic swimmer (born in the United Kingdom) (d. 2012)
 9 January 
 Max Burr, Tasmanian politician
 Rik Kemp, cartoonist (born in the United Kingdom)
 Gary Shearston, singer, songwriter and priest (d. 2013)
 10 January – Jill Kitson, radio broadcaster and literary journalist (d. 2013)
 12 January – John Gregg, actor (d. 2021)
 15 January – Ken Doolan, rear admiral and author
 20 January – Paul Braddy, 28th Deputy Premier of Queensland
 23 January – Peter Richardson, Western Australian politician 
 29 January – Germaine Greer, academic and feminist
 30 January – Dale Baker, 34th South Australian Leader of the Opposition (d. 2012)
 31 January – Paddy Guinane, Australian rules footballer (Richmond) (d. 2019)

February 

 1 February – John Haslem, Australian Capitol Territory politician
 5 February – Ian Norman, businessman and retail executive (d. 2014)
 7 February
 Betty Bobbitt, actress (born in the United States) (d. 2020)
 Ian Davis, Victorian politician (d. 2016)
 11 February – Gary Hooper, Paralympian athlete
 12 February – Nita Cunningham, Queensland politician (d. 2015)
 13 February – Andrew Peacock, 22nd Federal Leader of the Opposition (d. 2021)
 16 February – Peter Heerey, Federal Court judge (d. 2021) 
 19 February – Beatrice Faust, co-founder of Women's Electoral Lobby and author (d. 2019)
 23 February – Elaine Lee, actress (born in South Africa) (d. 2014)
 25 February – Gerald Murnane, writer
 27 February – Harry Roberts, rugby union player
 28 February – Ron Leeson, Western Australian politician

March 

 1 March
 Ivan Petch, New South Wales politician
 Alan Thorne, academic (d. 2012)
 5 March – Tony Rundle, 40th Premier of Tasmania
 7 March – Tony Lamb, Victorian politician
 8 March – Peter Nicholls, literary scholar and critic (d. 2018)
 10 March – Lin Powell, Queensland politician
 11 March – Bob Francis, radio presenter (born in Egypt) (d. 2016)
 18 March – Michael Kirby, High Court justice and academic
 20 March
 Patrick Quilty, geologist and palaeontologist (d. 2018)
 Johnny Rebb, rock and roll singer (d. 2014)
 25 March – Ted Mullighan, South Australian Supreme Court judge (d. 2011)

April 

 4 April – Alex George, botanist
 7 April – Brett Whiteley, artist (d. 1992)
 12 April
 Johnny Raper, rugby league footballer (d. 2022)
 Lyall Watson, botanist and author (born in South Africa) (d. 2008)
 14 April – Jennifer Fowler, composer
 20 April
 Elspeth Ballantyne, actress
 Chris Heyde, statistician (d. 2008)
 21 April 
 John Bangsund, science-fiction fan (d. 2020)
 Irwin Lewis, Indigenous artist (d. 2020)
 27 April – David de Kretser, 27th Governor of Victoria (born in British Ceylon)

May 

 1 May – Roger Degen, New South Wales politician
 4 May – Alan Carstairs, Western Australian politician
 9 May
 Garry Spry, Victorian politician
 Ken Warby, motorboat racer
 10 May – Peter Wilenski, public servant and ambassador (born in Poland) (d. 1994)
 12 May – Reg Gasnier, rugby league footballer (d. 2014)
 13 May – Barry Murphy, Victorian politician
 14 May – John Price, New South Wales politician
 15 May – Tony Staley, Victorian politician
 22 May – Angus Innes, Queensland politician and former Queensland Liberal leader (born in the United Kingdom)
 24 May – Alan Hayes, Australian rules footballer (Richmond) (d. 2019)
 29 May
 Alby Schultz, New South Wales politician (d. 2015)
 Roger Steele, Northern Territory politician

June 

 1 June – Ernie Tuck, mathematician (d. 2009)
 3 June – Colin Youren, Australian rules footballer (Hawthorn) (d. 2015)
 4 June – Elaine Schreiber, Paralympian athlete (d. 2017)
 5 June – Ron Baensch, racing cyclist (d. 2017)
 6 June – John Oswald, South Australian politician
 10 June
 Charles Abbott, Australian rules footballer (Hawthorn)
 John Read, Western Australian politician and former Administrator of the Cocos (Keeling) Islands
 20 June – Rodger Head, Australian rules footballer (St Kilda) (d. 2012)
 21 June
 Gordon Bilney, South Australian politician (d. 2012)
 Ken Catchpole, rugby union footballer (d. 2017)
 Marshall Younger, Australian rules footballer (South Melbourne)
 22 June – Paul Winkler, film director (born in Germany)
 23 June – David Hannay, film producer (born in New Zealand) (d. 2014)
 24 June – Annette Andre, actress
 25 June
 John Abel, New South Wales politician (d. 2019)
 David Ramage, rower
 Brian Lowe, Australian rules footballer (Geelong)
 27 June – Neil Hawke, test cricketer and Australian rules footballer (Port Adelaide) (d. 2000)
 29 June – Alan Connolly, cricketer

July 

 3 July
 Frank Blevins, 6th Deputy Premier of South Australia (d. 2013)
 Michele Brown, Olympic athlete
 7 July – Ron Evans, Australian rules footballer (Essendon) (d. 2007)
 9 July – Jack Danzey, rugby league footballer (d. 2020)
 10 July – Garry Young, Australian rules footballer (Hawthorn)
 12 July
 Phillip Adams, broadcaster and writer
 Helen Frith, athlete
 Graeme Lee, Australian rules footballer (St Kilda) (d. 2021)
 Ted Magrath, rugby union player
 Ann Symonds, New South Wales politician (d. 2018)
 13 July – John Sinclair, conservationist (d. 2019)
 14 July – John Murray, New South Wales politician
 19 July – Victor Kelleher, author (born in the United Kingdom)
 20 July – David Connolly, New South Wales politician
 21 July 
 Barbara Scott, Western Australian politician
 Kevin Wickham, Olympic rower (d. 2020)
 24 July
 John Anderson, Olympic sailor
 Thomas Anderson, Olympic sailor (d. 2010)
 26 July
 K. G. Cunningham, cricketer and radio personality
 John Howard, 25th Prime Minister of Australia
 28 July
 Vince Lester, Queensland politician
 John Zillman, meteorologist
 29 July – Mark Stoneman, Queensland politician
 31 July – Bill D'Arcy, Queensland politician

August 

 2 August – Roger Ryan, Northern Territory politician
 7 August – Sally Thomas, judge and former Administrator of the Northern Territory (born in the United Kingdom)
 12 August
 Pam Kilborn, Olympic athlete
 Mick Veivers, Queensland politician
 13 August
 Graeme Campbell, Western Australian politician (born in the United Kingdom)
 John Nicholls, Australian rules footballer (Carlton)
 18 August – Chris Pavlou, Australian rules footballer (Carlton) (d. 2012)
 23 August – Ray Halligan, Western Australian politician
 27 August – Len Diett, rugby union and rugby league player (d. 2018)

September 

 3 September – John Langmore, Australian Capitol Territory politician
 4 September – Richard Lewis, Western Australian politician (d. 2019)
 5 September – George Lazenby, actor 
 7 September – John McGrath, Victorian politician (d. 2021)
 8 September – Lew Mander, organic chemist (born in New Zealand) (d. 2020)
 9 September
 Arthur Dignam, actor (d. 2020)
 Hugh Wirth, veterinarian and animal welfare activist (d. 2018)
 10 September – Mike Dancis, basketball player (born in Latvia) (d. 2020)
 13 September – Kevin Rozzoli, New South Wales politician
 15 September – Ron Walker, businessman, former Lord Mayor of Melbourne (d. 2018)
 18 September – Gerry Harvey, entrepreneur
 19 September – Jim Lisle, rugby union and rugby league player (d. 2003)
 24 September – Tony Messner, South Australian politician and former Administrator of Norfolk Island

October 

 1 October – Philip Cox, architect
 3 October – Dave Barsley, rugby league player (d. 2021)
 4 October – Ivan Mauger, motorcycle speedway racer (born in New Zealand) (d. 2018)
 5 October – Scott Ashenden, South Australian politician
 7 October – Clive James, writer and broadcaster (d. 2019)
 8 October
 Sam Chisholm, media executive (born in New Zealand) (d. 2018)
 Paul Hogan, comedian and actor
 9 October – John Pilger, journalist and filmmaker
 12 October – Michael Clyne, linguist, academic, and intellectual (d. 2010)
 25 October – Terry Gill, actor (born in the United Kingdom) (d. 2015)
 26 October
 Barry Cunningham, Victorian politician (d. 2018)
 Nick Dondas, Northern Territory politician
 27 October – Hurtle Lupton, Victorian politician

November 
 1 November
 Kevin Pay, Australian rules footballer (Collingwood) (d. 2020)
 Ted Pickering, New South Wales politician
 Barry Pullen, Victorian politician
 4 November – George Mallaby, actor and scriptwriter (born in the United Kingdom) (d. 2004)
 9 November – Philip Cummins, Victorian Supreme Court judge (d. 2019)
 10 November – Allan Moffat, racing driver (born in Canada)
 11 November – Lloyd McDermott, barrister and rugby union player (d. 2019)
 18 November
 Max Phipps, actor (d. 2000)
 Clem Tisdell, economist and professor (d. 2022)
 19 November – Bruce McMaster-Smith, Australian rules footballer (Carlton) (d. 2017)
 20 November – Michael Beecher, model and actor (d. 1993)
 25 November
 Bob Maza, actor and playwright (d. 2000)
 Ian Smith, Victorian politician

December 

 3 December – Warwick Selvey, Olympic athlete (d. 2018)
 4 December – Denis Hinton, Queensland politician
 15 December – Andrew Lohrey, Tasmanian politician
 18 December – Bob Horne, New South Wales politician
 22 December – Silvia Smith, Tasmanian politician (d. 2020)
 26 December
 Ron Campbell, animator (d. 2021)
 Fred Schepisi, film director
 30 December – Glenda Adams, novelist (d. 2007)

Deaths

 14 February – James Webb, New South Wales politician (b. 1887)
 9 March – Edwin Greenslade Murphy, journalist and poet (b. 1866)
 11 March – William Miller, athlete (born in the United Kingdom and died in the United States) (b. 1846)
 7 April – Joseph Lyons, 10th Prime Minister of Australia and 26th Premier of Tasmania (b. 1879)
 25 April – Sir Charles Powers, High Court judge (b. 1853)
 18 May – Francis Clarke, New South Wales politician (b. 1857)
 10 June – Albert Ogilvie, 28th Premier of Tasmania (b. 1890)
 13 June – Arthur Coningham, cricketer (b. 1863)
 6 August – James MacCallum Smith, Western Australian politician (born in the United Kingdom) (b. 1868)
 11 August – Margaret Windeyer, librarian and feminist (b. 1866)
 30 August – Edward Sydney Simpson, mineralogist and geochemist (b. 1875)
 3 October – Henry Augustus Ellis, physician and federalist (born in Ireland and died in the United Kingdom) (b. 1861)
 22 October – Sir Langdon Bonython, South Australian politician and journalist (born in the United Kingdom) (b. 1848)
 15 November – William Hill, Victorian politician (b. 1866)
 6 December – Sir Ernest Scott, historian (born in the United Kingdom) (b. 1867)

See also
 List of Australian films of the 1930s

References

 
Australia
Years of the 20th century in Australia